Dzmitry Ivanow (born 21 February 1997) is a Belarusian professional footballer.

References

External links

Profile at teams.by

1997 births
Living people
Belarusian footballers
Association football forwards
FC Vitebsk players
FC Torpedo Minsk players
FC Orsha players
FC Energetik-BGU Minsk players
FC Neman Grodno players
Sportspeople from Vitebsk